Alexandre Eremenko (born 1954 in Kharkiv, Ukraine; , transcription: Olexandr Emanuilowitsch Jeremenko) is a Ukrainian-American mathematician who works in the fields of complex analysis and dynamical systems. He is a grandnephew of a Marshal of the Soviet Union Andrey Yeryomenko.

Academic career 
Eremenko was born into a medical family. His father Emmanuel Berger was a pathophysiologist, professor and head of the Department of pathophysiology at Ternopil National Medical University. His mother Neonila Eremenko was an ophthalmologist. He obtained his master's degree from Lviv University in 1976 and worked in the Institute of Low temperature physics and Engineering in Kharkiv until 1990. He received his PhD from Rostov State University in 1979 (Asymptotic Properties of Meromorphic and Subharmonic Functions), and is currently a distinguished professor at Purdue University.

In complex dynamics, Eremenko explored escaping sets at the iteration of entire, transcendent functions and conjectured that the connected components of this escaping set are unbounded (Eremenko's conjecture). The conjecture is still open.

Distinctions 
Eremenko was a recipient of the Humboldt Prize in Mathematics. In 2013 he became a fellow of the American Mathematical Society, for "contributions to value distribution theory, geometric function theory, and other areas of analysis and complex dynamics". He was an invited speaker in the International congress of mathematicians in Beijing in 2002.

See also 
 Polynomial lemniscate
 Gravity train
 Paul Eremenko

References

External links 
 

Living people
Ukrainian mathematicians
Fellows of the American Mathematical Society
1954 births
American people of Ukrainian descent
American people of Ukrainian-Jewish descent